Ann Sissons (née Fargher; born 25 June 1958) is a New Zealand diver and diving official.

Life
Sissons was born in Christchurch in 1958 and attended the University of Canterbury. Sissons was chosen to dive for New Zealand at the 1978 Commonwealth Games at Edmonton and the 1982 Commonwealth Games in Brisbane.

Sissons was the second woman Olympic diver for New Zealand when she dived in the 3 metre springboard event at the Los Angeles Games in 1984.

Sissons moved on to coach and became an official. In 2016 she was given a scholarship to travel to Puerto Rico to refresh her judging skills. Sissons is a member of Wellington Diving Club.

References

Living people
1958 births
University of Canterbury alumni
Sportspeople from Christchurch
Divers at the 1984 Summer Olympics
Olympic divers of New Zealand
Divers at the 1978 Commonwealth Games
Divers at the 1982 Commonwealth Games
Commonwealth Games competitors for New Zealand
New Zealand female divers